Tràng An is a scenic area near Ninh Bình, Vietnam renowned for its boat cave tours.
On 23 June 2014, at the 38th session of the World Heritage Committee in Doha, the Trang An Scenic Landscape Complex was inscribed as a UNESCO World Heritage Site.

The Trang An Scenic Landscape Complex includes Hoa Lư and Tam Cốc/Bích Động.

Location

Trang An wharf is located 3 km south of Hoa Lu ancient capital, 7 km from Ninh Binh city to the west along Trang An boulevard, 16 km from Tam Diep city in the north through Tam Coc. Trang An - Tam Coc zone has an area of more than 6,172 ha, which is a special protection area of scenic spots. This special protection zone is located within Hoa Lu special-use forest, belonging to Hoa Lu ancient capital preservation plan and also under the planning of Trang An World Heritage site with an area of 12,252 ha. In the Trang An landscape complex, the center of Hoa Lu ancient capital in the north, Tam Coc - Bich Dong tourist area is in the south and Trang An eco-tourism area is in the central position. These three areas are linked together by Hoa Lu special-use forest on limestone mountains and rivers, lakes and swamps

Diverse ecosystems

Trang An has two main types of ecosystems: limestone mountain ecosystem and aquatic ecosystem. The biological diversity of the communities is a major factor contributing to the creation of these two ecosystems.

The natural vegetation at Hoa Lu is limestone forests and evergreen forests in valleys between limestone areas. According to the survey results of Forest Inventory and Planning Institute (FIPI) and Ninh Binh Forest Protection Department, Trang An terrestrial ecosystem has more than 600 species of plants, 200 species of animals, many of which are in Vietnam's red list. The aquatic ecosystem consists of about 30 species of zooplanktons, 40 species of benthos, including many rare species, especially striped neck turtles that need to be protected. 

Trang An has more than 310 types of rare and precious plants such as cycas, sua, Indian mahogany, orchids, Chinese yam, honeysuckle, juniper, lettuce, etc. and endangered animal species such as mainland serow, leopard, phoenix pheasant.

Gallery

References

  

Populated places in Ninh Bình province
World Heritage Sites in Vietnam
Rock shelters